The Case Study of Vanitas is a manga written and illustrated by Jun Mochizuki. Set in 19th century Paris and contains vampire and steampunk thematics. The story focuses on the young Vanitas who possesses the grimoire called The Book of Vanitas and uses it to heal cursed vampires. The vampire Noé Archiviste joins Vanitas in his quest to save cursed vampires.

The series began in Square Enix's Monthly Gangan Joker on December 22, 2015. In April 2020, Mochizuki announced that the manga would be on hiatus due to the COVID-19 pandemic. The manga resumed publication in November 2020. Square Enix has collected its chapters into individual tankōbon volumes. The first volume was released on April 22, 2016. As of May 20, 2022, ten volumes have been released.

On December 3, 2015, Yen Press announced on its official Twitter account that it would be publishing new chapters of the series concurrently with Japan. The manga is also licensed in Taiwan by Sharp Point Press, in Hong Kong by Sparkle Roll, in South Korea by Daewon C.I., in France by Ki-oon, in Germany by Carlsen Manga, in Italy by Star Comics, in Spain by Norma Editorial, in Russia by Istari Comics, in Thailand by Siam Inter Comics, in Vietnam by Kim Đồng Publishing House and in Poland by Waneko.

Volume list

References

External links
  

Case Study of Vanitas